Chandra Mohan Yadav (Nepali: चन्द्र मोहन यादव) is a Nepali politician of Nepali Congress and member of Nepalese Constituent Assembly from Dhanusha 5. He is also central committee member of Nepali Congress. Yadav is the son of Ram Baran Yadav, the first president of Federal Democratic Republic of Nepal. In the party, Yadav is one of the closest to vice president Bimalendra Nidhi.

Yadav is also a doctor (radiologist) by profession.

Electoral history 
2013 Constituent Assembly Election

Dhanusha-5

See also 

 2022 Janakpur municipal election

References 

Nepali Congress politicians from Madhesh Province
People from Dhanusha District
Nepalese Hindus
Date of birth missing (living people)
Year of birth missing (living people)
Living people